literally "saw mountain" is a low mountain on the Bōsō Peninsula on Honshu, Japan. It lies on the southern border of the city of Futtsu and the town Kyonan in Awa District in Chiba Prefecture.

It falls steeply into Tokyo Bay on its western side, where it is pierced by two road tunnels and a rail tunnel, carrying the Uchibo Line south from Futtsu to Tateyama.  Both features are due in part to the mountain's history as a stone quarry in the Edo period, the marks of which are still picturesquely evident.

The temple is accessible by road and by a cable car, the Nokogiriyama Ropeway, which runs from Hamakanaya Station on the JR Uchibo Line to a lookout deck near the top of the temple precinct.

The western end of the mountain falls precipitously into Tokyo Bay, where Cape Myōgane is a good place to watch large ships pass through Uraga Channel at sunset.

Highlights

External links

 Nokogiriyama at 1000 Leaves Chiba Prefecture wiki encyclopedia
 Japan Times article
 JNTO article
 Geographical Survey Institute

Nokogiri, Mount
Futtsu
Kyonan